Lunar New Year is the beginning of a lunar calendar or lunisolar calendar year, whose months are moon cycles. The event is celebrated by numerous cultures in various ways at diverse dates.

The more well-known celebrations include New Year's Day (or week) in the Chinese calendar and Tibetan calendar of East Asia, the Buddhist and Hindu calendars of Southeast and South Asia, and the Islamic and Jewish calendars that originated in the Middle East. It is also celebrated by the Nisga'a people of Canada. The determination of the first day of a new lunar year varies by culture.

Definition
The Lunar New Year is an event celebrated by millions of people across the world on the first new moon of their calendar. Although often referred to as "Lunar New Year" in English, this is a misnomer, as it refers to both celebrations based on a lunar calendar as well as a lunisolar calendar. The Islamic New Year (also called the Hijri New Year or 1Muharram) is determined by the Islamic calendar, a purely lunar calendar that ignores the solar cycle that is used to reset lunisolar calendars. Lunar New Year celebrations in East and Central Asia, such as Chinese New Year, are based on a lunisolar calendar. Chinese New Year usually falls on the second new moon after the winter solstice (rarely the third if an intercalary month intervenes). Some Lunar New Year celebrations, such as in Korea and Vietnam, generally fall on the same day as the Chinese celebration in late January or February, due to being based on the Chinese calendar or a variation of it. However celebration customs and holiday durations may differ. Lunisolar New Year celebrations of other cultures such as Burmese, Cambodian, Lao, Sri Lankan, and Thai people are based on the Buddhist calendar and occur in mid-April.

In the United States of America, Lunar New Year is strongly associated with Chinese Americans and "Chinese New Year" is commonly used as a translation by people of non-Chinese backgrounds. Chinese New Year is the official name of the celebration and holiday in some countries such as Singapore, Brunei, and Malaysia. However the celebration has officially been known as "Spring Festival" in China since the founding of the Republic of China in 1911 when the previous name, "Yuandan" (The First Day), was assigned to the first day of the Gregorian calendar. Chinese people outside China refer to it as both Lunar New Year as well as Chinese New Year. Since at least the mid-2010s, there has been criticism in America of using the term "Chinese New Year" in an official capacity, particularly by Korean and Vietnamese people. Some American politicians have avoided using the term "Chinese New Year" in preference for  "Lunar New Year".

Celebrations

East Asia
China, Taiwan, South Korea, and Vietnam celebrate the Lunisolar New Year on the same date. Japan, excluding the Ryukyu islands, now only celebrates the solar new year apart from a remnant of the lunisolar celebration called  occurring on the 15th day of the first lunar month for Japanese calendar.

Chinese New Year ( or )
Tujia New Year ( or )
Tsagaan Sar (Mongolian New Year) Mongol Bichig: ᠴᠠᠭᠠᠨ ᠰᠠᠷᠠ)
Miao New Year (Hmongic: Nongx Yangx; Chinese: 能央)
Japanese New Year (正月 Shōgatsu) (prior to 1873)
Ryukyu New Year
Korean New Year
Vietnamese New Year (chữ Hán: 節元旦)

Tibetans and Mongols celebrate New Year in February or early March, based on the closely related Tibetan calendars. Chinese-Mongols celebrate Tsagaan Sar according to Chinese calendar. The Uyghurs adopted the Chinese calendar, and the Mongols and Tibetans adopted the Tibetan calendar. Depending on the year, the Tibetan New Year can either coincide with the Chinese New Year, or take place around one month later.
Tsagaan Sar (Mongolian New Year) (Cagán sar; Mongol Bichig: ᠴᠠᠭᠠᠨ ᠰᠠᠷᠠ)
Losar (Tibetan New Year)

China 

The history of the Chinese New Year festival can be traced back to more than 4000 years ago. Before the new year celebration was formed, ancient Chinese gathered around and celebrated at the end of harvest in autumn. However, the celebration is not Mid-Autumn Festival, during which Chinese gathered with family and worship the moon. In the Classic of Poetry, a poem written during Western Zhou (1045 BC – 771 BC), by an anonymous farmer, described how people cleaned up millet stack-sites, toasted to guests with mijiu, killed lambs and cooked the meat, went to their master's home, toasted to the master, and cheered for long lives together, in the 10th month of an ancient solar calendar, which was in autumn. The celebration is believed to be one of the prototypes of the Chinese New Year.

The first dated Chinese new year celebration can be traced back to Warring States period (475 BC – 221 AD). In Lüshi Chunqiu, an exorcistic ritual called "Big Nuo (大儺)" was recorded being carried out in the ending day of a year to expel illness in Qin (state). Later, after Qin unified China and the Qin dynasty was founded, the ritual was continued. It evolved to cleaning up houses thoroughly in the preceding days of Chinese New Year.

The first mentioning of the celebration of the start of a new year was recorded in Han dynasty (202 BC – 220 AD). In the book Simin Yueling (四民月令), written by Eastern Han's agronomist and writer Cui Shi (崔寔), the celebration was recorded by stating "The starting day of the first month, is called ‘Zheng Ri’. I bring my wife and children, to worship ancestors and commemorate my father." Later he wrote: "Children, wife, grandchildren, and great-grandchildren all serve pepper wine to their parents, make their toast, and wish their parents good health. It's a thriving view." People also went to acquaintances' homes and wished each other a happy new year. In Book of the Later Han Volume 27, 吴良, a county officer was recorded going to his prefect's house with a government secretary, toasting to the prefect and praising the prefect's merit.

Lunar new year is the grandest ancient traditional festival in China, commonly known as "Guo Nian". This festival means the beginning of spring and the arrival of the new year. The customs of Chinese lunar new year include sticking Spring Festival couplets, buying New Year's goods, and having family dinner together.

Taiwan 

While there is little recorded history of when Lunar New Year was first observed in Taiwan, it is known that the indigenous population had other ceremonies and did not originally celebrate the festival. It was likely first celebrated by the Hakka or Hoklo populations that migrated from now part of mainland China to the island during the 17th century. Due to Taiwan's population being mostly Han Chinese, its Lunar New Year celebration is very similar to that of China, especially in regards to traditions. However, in modern day, there can be more of a focus on visiting Buddhist or Taoist temples with extended family members. There are also notable variations to the food that is eaten during this time, such as the consumption of pineapple cakes and other products derived from pineapples or daikon since the latter is a homophone for "good fortune" in Hokkien.

Korea 

The earliest references to Korean New Year are found in 7th-century Chinese historical works, the Book of Sui and the Old Book of Tang, containing excerpts of celebrations during the New Year in the Silla Kingdom for Korean calendar, which was influenced by the Tang dynasty's calendaric system. Under the rule of 21st King of Silla, new year was celebrated in 488 AD. Then celebration of Korean New Year have continued to Goryeo and Joseon.

As opposed to red envelopes, Korean New Year tends to involve white envelopes.

South Asia
These South Asian traditional lunisolar celebrations are observed according to the local lunisolar calendars. They are influenced by Indian tradition, which marks the system of lunar months in a solar sidereal year. A separate solar new year also exists for those Indian regions which use solar months in a solar sidereal year.
 Gudi Padwa: Maharashtra and Goa.
 Ugadi: Andhra Pradesh, Telangana and Karnataka
 Puthandu: Tamil Nadu
 Chaitra Navaratri: North and Central India
 Balipratipada: Gujarat, Rajasthan
 Cheti Chand: Sindhi Hindus
 Navreh: Kashmiri Hindus
 Sajibu Cheiraoba: Manipur
 Mha Puja: Nepal (Newaris)
The following are influenced by the Tibetan calendar:
 Galdan Namchot: Ladakh
 Losoong: Sikkim
 Losar: Arunachal Pradesh (Monpas)
 Gyalpo Lhosar: Sherpas
 Tamu Lhosar: Gurungs
 Sonam Lhosar: Tamangs

India 
Various lunar calendars continue to be used throughout India in traditional and religious life. However, they are different from the Chinese lunisolar calendar used in East Asia. The two most common lunar new year celebrations in India are Diwali, and Gudi Padwa/Ugadi/Puthandu. Diwali typically falls in October or November, and Gudi Padwa/Ugadi/Puthandu typically falls in April.  

In ancient times, the sun's entry into Aries coincided with the equinox. However, due to the earth's axial precession, the sidereal year is slightly longer than the tropical year, causing the dates to gradually drift apart. Today, the sun's entry into Aries occurs around 18 April, according to astronomical definitions. Some traditional calendars are still marked by the sun's actual movements while others have since been fixed to the Gregorian calendar.

Southeast Asia
The following Southeast Asian Lunar New Year celebration is observed according to the local lunisolar calendar and is influenced by Indian Hindu traditions.
 Nyepi (Balinese New Year): Bali, Indonesia
 Rija Nukan (Cham New Year): Chams
The following Southeast Asian Lunar New Year celebration is observed according to the local lunisolar calendar and is influenced by Islamic traditions.
 Satu Suro (Javanese New Year): The Javanese calendar follows a purely lunar calendar of 12 months that retrogresses through the Gregorian and Julian calendar years. As in the Islamic calendar, the day of Javanese New Year may thus fall in any season on the calendar.

Singapore 
Lunar New Year is officially known as "Chinese New Year" in Singapore. It is celebrated in Singapore primarily by members of Chinese diaspora, who make up three-quarters of the population. They include those who are Hokkien, Cantonese and Teochew from southeastern China; Hainanese from the island province of Hainan; Hakka, a migrant group spread out all over China; and Peranakan, who have been in the region for over 400 years and also have mixed Malay and European ancestry. Each ethnic group has its own set of traditions, as well as creating new ones incorporating elements from other cultures like Malays and Indians.

Malaysia 
Malaysia is a multi-cultural country. The three dominant ethnic groups in Malaysia are the Malays, the Chinese, and the Indians. Each group has its unique culture and traditional festivals. Public holidays are declared on the three important festivals celebrated by the Malays, Chinese, and Indians, namely Hari Raya Puasa, Chinese New Year and Deepavali respectively.
	
As timing of these three important festivals fluctuates due to their reliance on the lunar calendars, they occasionally occur close to one another—every 33 years to be exact. Malaysians has named this phenomenon Kongsi Raya (Gongxi Raya), a Malaysian portmanteau, denoting the Chinese New Year and Hari Raya Aidilfitri festivals.

Vietnam 

The earliest celebration of the Lunar New Year in Vietnam is presumed by some to be brought by the Emperor Triệu Đà. The Chinese brought with them their own policies, cultures, and traditions. The Lunar New Year was passed to the Vietnamese people and has stayed relatively intact through the centuries, despite uneasy and often hostile relations between the two countries. The main difference between the Chinese and Vietnamese calendars is that the Vietnamese zodiac replaces the Ox and Rabbit in the Chinese zodiac with the Buffalo and Cat, respectively. However, it is noteworthy that the Tết Nguyên Đán (Spring Festival) which is celebrated in late January or in the first half of February coincides with the onset of Spring in the regions of northern Vietnam and parts of southern China where the ancient Laos–Thailand kingdom of Âu Lạc and some regions of the Baiyue people are located. The celebration marks the beginning of a new planting season, particularly rice. There is also the historical legend of the origin of bánh chưng, which started on the occasion of Tết. All early written records of the country have been destroyed through the millennia by numerous invasions from various groups. 

Vietnamese New Year can also be traced back to the Lý dynasty (1009 AD – 1226 AD). Vietnamese people often celebrated their Tết holiday by painting tattoos on themselves, drinking rice liquor, eating betel nuts, and making bánh chưng, as well as pickled onions. During the period of Emperor Lê Thánh Tông (1442 AD – 1497 AD), Tết was considered a significant festival in Vietnam. Lucky money is also given on Lunar New Year.

Middle East/West Asia
Lunar new year celebrations that originated in Middle East fall on other days:
 The Hijri calendar used by most of Islam, is a purely lunar calendar of 12 lunar months: its year is shorter by about ten days than the Gregorian calendar year. Consequently Islamic New Year's Day may fall in any season: occasionally there can be two Islamic new years in one Gregorian year (as last happened in 2008). In 2022, the Islamic New Year fell on July 30, 2022, and in 2023, it is expected to fall on July 19, 2023.
 In Judaism there are as many as four lunar new year observances. Since the Hebrew calendar is lunisolar, the days always fall in the same season.
 Nisan is the month of the "barley ripening", or "spring" Aviv/Abib, and the book of Exodus 12:1–2, has God instructing Moses to command the Israelites to fix the new moon, the 1st day, of Nisan at the first, or head moon of the year. The talmud in Rosh Hashanah (tractate) 2a calls this the Rosh HaShana, the new year, for kings and pilgrimages. The climax of this lunar new year is the festival of Passover, which begins on 15 Nisan/Abib (Aviv). It is also the first day of secular new years in Karaite Judaism and Samaritanism.
 1 Elul corresponds to the New Year for Animal Tithes in the Rabbinic tradition. Elul is the sixth month, a very late summer/early autumn holiday. It is the date on which the Samaritan calendar advances a year, on the theory that 1 Elul commemorates the creation of the Earth.
 1 Tishrei, is called Yom teruah, Day of (trumpet) Blasts in the written Torah, and it falls on the first of the "seventh month". It is translated Feast of Trumpets in most English bible translations. This Day of trumpet Blasts was also called Rosh Hashanah, literally "new year", in Rabbinic Judaism, on the theory that it is Yom haDin, a universal judgment day for all the children of Adam including Jews. Thus the universal, secular new year. It is the date on which the Rabbinic calendar advances a year, on the theory that 1 Tishrei is the day on which the world was born. Rosh Hashanah also inaugurates the ten days known as the High Holy Days/High Holidays or Days of Awe, culminating with Yom Kippur; which is the holiest day of the year in Rabbinic Judaism. For Samaritans and Karaites, Passover remains the holiest day of the year.
 Tu BiShvat is the New Year for Trees in Rabbinic Judaism. On this day, every tree ages one year. The age of a tree determines whether it is subject to certain tithes. In the modern era, it has become festive holiday with some ecological overtones.
Ebionites new year
Nazarene (sect) new year

North America

Canada 
Hobiyee, also spelled Hoobiyee, Hobiiyee and Hoobiiyee, is the new year of the Nisg̱a'a people, celebrated in February or March. It signifies the emergence of the first crescent moon and begins the month Buxw-laḵs. Celebrations of Hobiyee are done by Nisg̱a'a wherever they are located, but the largest celebrations are in Nisg̱a'a itself and in areas with a large Nisg̱a'a presence like Vancouver.

See also

 Chinese lunisolar calendar
 East Asian cultural sphere
 Greater India

 New Year
 New Year's Day
 Lunisolar calendar

 South and Southeast Asian solar New Year
 List of lunar calendars
 List of lunisolar calendars

Notes

References

Bibliography

External links
 

New Year celebrations